The Ring of the Empress (German: Spielereien einer Kaiserin) is a 1930 German silent film directed by Vladimir Strizhevsky and starring Lil Dagover.

The film's art direction was by Otto Erdmann and Hans Sohnle.

Cast
In alphabetical order
 Eugen Burg 
 Lil Dagover as Catherine I of Russia
 Boris de Fast 
 Jaro Fürth 
 Nikolai Malikoff 
 Sybill Morel 
 Alexander Murski 
 Vera Pawlowa 
 Dimitri Smirnoff as Peter the Great
 Dina Smirnova
 Peter Voß as Alexander Danilovich Menshikov

References

Bibliography
 Goble, Alan. The Complete Index to Literary Sources in Film. Walter de Gruyter, 1999.

External links

1930 films
1930s historical films
German historical films
Films of the Weimar Republic
Films directed by Vladimir Strizhevsky
German silent feature films
German black-and-white films
Cultural depictions of Peter the Great
Biographical films about Russian royalty
1930s German films